Elena Gatti Caporaso (2 March 1918 – 13 September 1999) was an Italian socialist politician and feminist.

Political career
She joined the Italian Socialist Party and played an important leadership role from 1949, as well as militating for civil rights as a member of the Unione donne italiane along with her friend Giuliana Nenni. In 1954, at the National Conference of Socialist Women, she defined emancipation as an issue common to all women, cutting across class lines.

References

1918 births
1999 deaths
Italian feminists
Italian Socialist Party politicians
Italian socialists
Italian socialist feminists